Fergie MacDonald MBE (born 1938, Glasgow, Scotland) is a Scottish accordionist who specializes in ceilidh music and plays the button key accordion. A trained physiotherapist and an international clay pigeon shooter, MacDonald is considered to be the man who popularised the West Highland style of traditional Scottish dance music. He was brought up in Moidart.

MacDonald topped the Scottish Singles Chart in 1966 with his tune "Loch Maree Islands". He was initially banned from appearing on the BBC due to the traditional audition process, but is now regularly featured on BBC Radio Scotland and BBC Radio nan Gaidheal.

He still tours today throughout the world and has released 23 albums to date. He is well known through the tales told by fellow Scottish accordionist Phil Cunningham as part of his stage act.

He released his autobiography in 2003, Fergie: Memories of a Musical Legend.

Selected discography
It's Scotland's Music – Fergie MacDonald and his Highland Band, Shona SH 7001
21st Album: Traditional Ceilidh Music – Fergie MacDonald (1997), Greentrax Recordings

References

External links
Fergie On-line
Fergie MacDonald Profile

Scottish accordionists
British physiotherapists
People from Lochaber
Living people
21st-century accordionists
1938 births